Earth, Wind & Fire (abbreviated as EWF or EW&F) is an American band that has spanned the musical genres of R&B, soul, funk, jazz, disco, pop, rock, dance, Latin, and Afro pop. They have been described as one of the most innovative and commercially successful acts of all time. Rolling Stone called them "innovative, precise yet sensual, calculated yet galvanizing" and declared that the band "changed the sound of black pop". VH1 has also described EWF as "one of the greatest bands" ever.

The band was founded in Chicago by Maurice White in 1969, having grown out of a previous band known as the Salty Peppers. Other prominent members of EWF have included Philip Bailey, Verdine White, Ralph Johnson, Larry Dunn, Al McKay, Roland Bautista, Sonny Emory, Sheldon Reynolds and Andrew Woolfolk. The band has won six Grammys from their 17 nominations. They have won four American Music Awards out of 12 nominations. They have also been inducted into the Rock and Roll Hall of Fame and the Vocal Group Hall of Fame, received a star on the Hollywood Walk of Fame, and sold over 90 million records, making them one of the world's best-selling bands of all time.

EWF has been inducted into the NAACP Image Award Hall of Fame and Hollywood's Rockwalk. The band have also been bestowed with an ASCAP Rhythm & Soul Heritage Award, BET Lifetime Achievement Award and Soul Train Legend Award.

Earth, Wind & Fire is known for its horn section, kalimba sound, energetic and elaborate stage shows, and the contrast between Philip Bailey's falsetto vocals and Maurice White's baritone. EWF were bestowed with the NARAS Signature Governor's Award. Earth, Wind & Fire also went on to be honoured with a Grammy Lifetime Achievement Award.
The band was also bestowed with the 2012 Congressional Horizon Award.

Albums

Studio albums

Live albums

Compilation albums

Singles

Other appearances 

 "Dance, Dance, Dance" from the Rock & Rule soundtrack (1983)
 "One World" from the album Music Speaks Louder Than Words (1990)
 "Frontline of Seduction" from the "Blood Brothers" single (1993)
 "Holiday" from The PJs soundtrack (1999)
 "Whatever Happened" from the Undercover Brother soundtrack (2002)

Videography

Notes

References

External links
 
 

Rhythm and blues discographies
Rock music group discographies
Discographies of American artists
Discography
Soul music discographies
Funk music discographies
Disco discographies